Felipe Barreto da Silva, known as a Felipinho, is a Brazilian footballer who plays for Al-Muharraq SC.

References

External links
 
Soccer Talents Profile

1992 births
Living people
Brazilian footballers
Brazil youth international footballers
Brazilian expatriate footballers
Sport Club Internacional players
Jeju United FC players
Club Athletico Paranaense players
K League 1 players
Expatriate footballers in South Korea
Brazilian expatriate sportspeople in South Korea
Association football forwards
Footballers from Porto Alegre